
Gmina Sułkowice is an urban-rural gmina (administrative district) in Myślenice County, Lesser Poland Voivodeship, in southern Poland.

Villages
Apart from the town of Sułkowice, Gmina Sułkowice contains the villages and settlements of Biertowice, Harbutowice, Krzywaczka and Rudnik.

Neighbouring gminas
Gmina Sułkowice is bordered by the gminas of Budzów, Lanckorona, Myślenice, Pcim and Skawina.

References
Polish official population figures 2006

Sulkowice
Myślenice County